The Intel-based iMac is a discontinued series of Macintosh all-in-one desktop computers designed, manufactured and sold by Apple Inc. from 2006 to 2022. While sold, it was one of three desktop computers in the Macintosh lineup, serving as an all-in-one alternative to the Mac Mini, and sat below the performance range Mac Pro. It was sold alongside the Xeon-based iMac Pro from 2017 to 2021.

Pre-2009 iMac models featured either a white polycarbonate enclosure or an aluminum enclosure. The October 2009 iMac model featured a unibody aluminum enclosure, a version of which could had been seen on the latest models before the launch of the Apple silicon colourful iMacs. The iMacs released in October 2012 also featured a much thinner display, with the edge measuring just 5 mm.

The Intel-based iMac was succeeded by the iMac M1 beginning in 2021 as part of the Mac transition to Apple silicon. On April 20, 2021, Apple discontinued the 21.5-inch Intel iMac with 4K Retina Display following the release of a 24-inch model based on the Apple M1 processor, and discontinued the remaining non-Retina models in October 2021. The 27-inch model was discontinued on March 8, 2022, following the announcement of the Mac Studio and 27-inch Apple Studio Display.

History 
At the Macworld Conference and Expo on January 10, 2006, Steve Jobs announced that the new iMac would be the first Macintosh to use an Intel CPU, the Core Duo. The introduction of the new iMac along with the Intel-based MacBook Pro was the start of the Mac transition to Intel processors. In the following months, the other Mac products followed, including the introduction of the Intel Core-powered Mac mini on February 28, 2006, the MacBook consumer line of laptop computers on May 16, 2006, the Mac Pro on August 7, 2006, and the Xserve in November 2006, completing the transition.

The features, price, and case design remained unchanged from the iMac G5. The processor speed, however, according to tests run by Apple using SPEC, was declared to be two to three times faster than the iMac G5.

On June 22, 2020, Apple's Worldwide Developer Conference keynote included the announcement that future Macintosh computers would transition yet again to Apple's own ARM-based system-on-chips; in April 2021, Apple unveiled a redesigned iMac based on its M1 system-on-chip.

Polycarbonate (2006) 

Alongside the MacBook Pro, the iMac Core Duo represents Apple's first computer to feature Intel processors instead of PowerPC processors. It retained the style, design, and features of the preceding iMac G5.

In early February 2006, Apple confirmed reports of video display problems on the new Intel-based iMacs. When playing video on Apple's Front Row media browser, some 20-inch iMacs (those built-to-order with upgraded video cards) showed random horizontal lines, ghosting, video tearing and other problems. The problem was fixed with a software update.

In early September 2006, Apple introduced a new version of the iMac including a Core 2 Duo chip and a lower price. Apple added a new 24-inch model with IPS-display and a resolution of 1920 × 1200 (WUXGA), making it the first iMac to be able to display 1080p content in its full resolution, and a VESA Flat Display Mounting Interface. Except for the 17-inch 1.83 GHz processor model, this version also included an 802.11n draft card.

Specifications of polycarbonate iMacs 

All Obsolete

Aluminum (2007–2009) 

In August 2007, Apple introduced a complete redesign of the iMac, featuring an aluminum, glass and plastic enclosure. There is only one visible screw on the entire computer, located at the base of the iMac for accessing the memory slots. It has a black, plastic backplate that is not user-removable. The 17-inch model was completely removed from the lineup.

In March 2009, Apple released a minor refresh of the iMac line. Changes included a fourth USB port, replacement of two FireWire 400 ports with one FireWire 800 port, replacement of mini-DVI with Mini DisplayPort, and a slightly redesigned base which is thinner. The exterior design was almost identical to the older Intel-based iMacs. The models were one 20-inch configuration and three 24-inch configurations (instead of two at each screen size as before).

Apple doubled the default RAM and hard-disk size on all models, moving the RAM to the DDR3 specification. This revision also introduced a new, smaller, and more compact Apple Keyboard that excluded the numeric keypad and forward delete key in favor of the fn + Delete keyboard shortcut by default. Users could, however, replace this version with a more traditional, full-size model with a numeric keypad by requesting Apple to build their machine to order through its online store.

Specifications of aluminum iMacs 
All are obsolete.

Unibody (2009–2011) 

In October 2009, a 16:9 aspect ratio screen was introduced in 21.5" and 27" models, replacing the 20" and 24" 16:10 aspect ratio screens of the previous aluminum models (a 24" iMac was brought back in 2021). The back is now a continuation of the aluminum body from the front and sides instead of a separate plastic backplate. Video card options entirely switched to AMD, save for the standard onboard Nvidia card in the base smaller model. The iMac's processor selection saw a significant increase.

The Intel i-series chips are introduced to Mac for the first time on the higher-spec 27-inch models.

Default RAM has also been increased across the iMac range. With the advent of the larger screens, Apple doubled the number of memory slots from two to four. Consequently, the maximum memory capacity was also doubled (to 16 GB), and for Intel Core i-series (27-inch), quadrupled, to 32 GB.

The 27-inch models of the line became the first to offer Target Display Mode, allowing the iMac to be used as an external display for another Mac computer when connected via Mini DisplayPort, a feature that was extended to the 21.5-inch models onwards with the introduction of Thunderbolt.

The Mid 2010 iMac 27" has AMD Radeon HD5650 and HD5750 graphic cards. Both cards cannot support the low-level Metal API, preventing this model from upgrading to Mojave and Catalina. AMD had developed a firmware upgrade that would allow both graphic cards to support Metal and Mid 2010 iMac to be upgraded to latest macOS, but Apple had refused to certify them.

The Late 2011 Unibody iMac is also the last model to include an internal SuperDrive.

Specifications of unibody iMacs 

All Obsolete

Slim Unibody (2012–2017) 

In October 2012, a new iMac model was introduced that featured a smaller body depth than the previous models, measuring 5 mm at its thinnest point, and without an internal SuperDrive. This was partly achieved by using a process called Full lamination. The display and glass are laminated together, eliminating a 2 mm gap between them. The 21.5-in and 27-in screens remained at their previous resolutions, 1920 × 1080 and 2560 × 1440 respectively.

As with the 2009 model, memory has been upgraded; the standard specification is now 8 GB, with the 21.5-in model supporting up to 16 GB and the 27-in model supporting up to 32 GB. It was reported that the 21.5 in iMac would have non-replaceable soldered memory similar to the MacBook Air and Retina display MacBook Pro though tear-downs show that it uses removable memory but accessing the modules requires ungluing the screen and removing the motherboard. The 27-in version features an access port to upgrade memory without disassembling the display. Apple also upgraded the computers' processors, using Intel's Ivy Bridge microarchitecture-based Core i5 and Core i7 microprocessors.

Video cards are now Nvidia as standard. USB 3.0 ports are now included for the first time. The 2012 iMac also features the option of a Fusion Drive which combines an SSD and a conventional HDD to create more efficient and faster storage. Apple also removed the built-in optical drive starting with the 2012 model.

On March 5, 2013, Apple quietly announced an education-only version of the iMac, with less powerful specs for a cheaper price. It included a 3.3 GHz dual-core Intel Core i3 processor, 4 GB memory, a 0.5 TB (1 TB = 1000 billion bytes) hard drive and Intel HD Graphics 4000, retailing for US$1,099, $200 cheaper than the base-level consumer iMac.

On September 24, 2013, the 2012 iMac model was updated with 4th-generation Intel Haswell processors and Nvidia 7xx series GPU, promising up to 1.4× improvements in performance. It also has 802.11ac Wi-Fi, which is capable of reaching speeds up to 1300 Mbit/s and PCIe-based flash storage, offering up to 1.5× the performance of previous Ivy Bridge unibody iMacs. This applies to both the Fusion Drive and pure-SSD options. These became the last iMacs to offer Target Display Mode, as the Retina line introduced the following year are incompatible with the feature due to resolution differences.

At WWDC on June 5, 2017, a refreshed model was added with Kaby Lake processors and Bluetooth 4.2 support. Apple retailed the 21.5-inch model until October 29, 2021. It was sold in a single stock configuration priced at $1,099 with a 2.3 GHz dual-core 7th-generation Intel Core i5 processor. The machine was heavily criticized (more so towards the end of its production) for its lagging specifications, outdated design, and comparatively high price. The machine, however, was said to be popular among education shoppers. It was the last Mac to have a Fusion Drive (albeit as an option), and after having them for 36 years, the last Mac to have a traditional hard drive, also It was the last Apple Product to have non Retina Display.

Specifications of slim unibody iMacs

Retina (2014–2020) 

A Retina Display "5K" model with a resolution of 5120 × 2880 was introduced alongside the previous year's models during a keynote on October 16, 2014. This 27-inch model was given faster Haswell processors and its two Thunderbolt ports were updated to Thunderbolt 2. Secondary storage was also upgraded to a 1 TB Fusion drive as standard and video options changed over to AMD Radeon R9 M290X and M295X.

In May 2015, a separate, affordable, budget counterpart of the 5K 27-inch iMac was announced with lower specifications. That same day the Late 2013 iMac lineup was completely discontinued. Later that year, a 21.5-inch "4K" model with a resolution of 4096 × 2304 was released on October 13, 2015 with older Broadwell processors, as the 27-inch counterparts were upgraded that day directly to Skylake ones. The new rechargeable and wireless peripherals were also introduced that day.

In 2017 both 21.5 and 27-inch iMacs were refreshed with Kaby Lake processors, DDR4 memories and upgraded AMD graphics with doubled or more graphic memories, Thunderbolt 3 (USB-C) ports, and Bluetooth 4.2.

The iMacs were refreshed again in 2019 with Coffee Lake processors, including a 8-core one as Built to Order option, slightly faster memory, and upgraded graphics including AMD Vega graphics as top of line Built to Order options.

On August 4, 2020, the last update for Intel based iMacs, Apple refreshed the 27-inch 5K iMac with Comet Lake processors, AMD RDNA architecture GPUs, the T2 security chip, a 1080p FaceTime camera, Bluetooth 5, improved speakers and microphones, and solid state drives (SSD) standard. 10 Gigabit Ethernet and nano-etched glass, similar to the Pro Display XDR, are available as upgrade options. All models include non-replaceable, soldered SSDs, while models upgraded to 4 TB and 8 TB include an expansion bay for a second SSD,

The 2019 21.5-inch models remained available but received a minor configuration change with SSDs standard, with higher-capacity Fusion Drives as a free build-to-order option, while hard disk drives were no longer available, though the 21.5" inch model as the last one in the Macintosh lineup, still lacked the Apple T2 security chip. After including them in Macs for 35 years starting with the Macintosh XL in 1985, the 2020 refresh marked the end of hard disk drives in standard configuration Macs, as the 21.5-inch iMac was the only Mac still sold with them. In March 2021, Apple silently removed the 512 GB and 1 TB SSD configurations for the 21.5-inch iMac.

The 21.5 inch iMac with 4K Retina Display was discontinued on April 20, 2021, after the announcement of the first Apple silicon-based iMac. The 27-inch model was discontinued on March 8, 2022, after the announcement of the Mac Studio and 27-inch Apple Studio Display, and marked the end of Intel-based iMac models, and the return of the iMac to a single sized model since the introduction of 17" inch iMac G4 in 2002.

Specifications of Retina iMacs

Supported operating systems

Timeline of iMac models

Notes

References

External links 

IMac family
Macintosh all-in-ones
X86 Macintosh computers
Computer-related introductions in 2006
Products and services discontinued in 2022